Traktirsky is a rural locality (a khutor) in Logovskoye Rural Settlement, Ilovlinsky District, Volgograd Oblast, Russia. The population was 2 as of 2010.

Geography 
Traktirsky is located in steppe, on south of Volga Upland, 31 km northwest of Ilovlya (the district's administrative centre) by road. Log is the nearest rural locality.

References 

Rural localities in Ilovlinsky District